Masoud Ghadimi (1 February 1965 – 26 June 2003) was an Iranian wrestler. He competed in the men's Greco-Roman 68 kg at the 1988 Summer Olympics. He got injured seriously while training in 1997 and died six years later on 26 June 2003.

References

External links
 

1965 births
2003 deaths
Iranian male sport wrestlers
Olympic wrestlers of Iran
Wrestlers at the 1988 Summer Olympics
People from Mianeh
Asian Games medalists in wrestling
Wrestlers at the 1990 Asian Games
Asian Games bronze medalists for Iran
Medalists at the 1990 Asian Games
20th-century Iranian people
21st-century Iranian people